June 12 - Eastern Orthodox Church calendar - June 14

All fixed commemorations below celebrated on June 26 by Orthodox Churches on the Old Calendar.

For June 13th, Orthodox Churches on the Old Calendar commemorate the Saints listed on May 30.

Saints
 Martyr Aquilina of Byblos in Lebanon (293)
 Martyr Antonina of Nicaea (c. 284-305)
 Martyr Diodorus of Emesus, who was crucified.
 The Myriad Holy Martyrs, by the sword.
 Saint Triphyllius, Bishop of Ledra (Leucosia, Nicosia) in Cyprus (c. 370)
 Saint Antipater of Bostra, Bishop of Bostra in Arabia Petraea (458)
 Saint Eulogius of Alexandria, Patriarch of Alexandria (607)
 Saint Anna of Larissa in Thessaly (826) and her son John (9th century)
 Saint Jacob the Ascetic (James), who was demonically deceived and worshipped antichrist, but later repented.

Pre-Schism Western saints
 Saint Felicula, a virgin-martyr in Rome under Domitian (c. 90)
 Saints Fortunatus and Lucian, martyrs in North Africa.
 Saint Damhnade, a holy virgin in Ireland who was greatly venerated in County Cavan and County Fermanagh.
 Saint Damnat, a nun who seems to have lived and died at Sliabh Beagh, County Monaghan, Ireland, possibly the same as Damhnade.
 Saint Peregrinus (Cetheus, Cetteus, Cetteo di Amiterno), Bishop of L'Aquila in the Abruzzi in Italy (c. 600)
 Saint Rambert (Ragnebert, Ragnobert),  a courtier in Austrasia in the east of France, he was murdered by the tyrant Ebroin in the Jura mountains (c. 680)
 Saint Fandilas, a priest and Abbot of Peñamelaria near Cordoba in Spain, beheaded in Cordoba by order of the Emir Mohammed (853)

Post-Schism Orthodox saints
 Venerable Andronicus, disciple of Saint Sergius of Radonezh, Abbot (1395)
 Venerable Sabbas of Moscow, Abbot (1410)
 Saint Niphon Kausokalybites, monk, of Kapsokalyvia, Mount Athos (1411)  (see also:  June 14 )
 Saint Philotheos of Sklataina, second founder of the Monastery of St. Stephen at Meteora (1550)
 New Hieromartyr Anthimus the Iberian, Metropolitan of Wallachia (1716)
 Venerable Alexandra (Melgunova) of Diveyevo, foundress of Diveyevo Convent (1789)
 Saint John Triantaphyllides, the New Chrysostom and Merciful, of Chaldia in Asia Minor (1903)

New martyrs and confessors
 New Hieromartyr Alexei Archangelsky, Priest (1918)
 New Hieromartyr Demetrius, Priest (1940)
 Virgin-Martyr Pelagea Zidko (1944)

Other commemorations
 Finding of the relics (1960) of Hieromartyr Nicholas of Lesvos, Deacon (1463)
 Synaxis of New Martyrs and Confessors of Zaporizhzhia, Ukraine. 
 Repose of Archimandrite Dimitry (Egorov) of Santa Rosa, California (1992)

Icon gallery

Notes

References

Sources
 June 13/26. Orthodox Calendar (PRAVOSLAVIE.RU).
 June 26 / June 13. HOLY TRINITY RUSSIAN ORTHODOX CHURCH (A parish of the Patriarchate of Moscow).
 June 13. OCA - The Lives of the Saints.
 The Autonomous Orthodox Metropolia of Western Europe and the Americas (ROCOR). St. Hilarion Calendar of Saints for the year of our Lord 2004. St. Hilarion Press (Austin, TX). pp. 43–44.
 The Thirteenth Day of the Month of June. Orthodoxy in China.
 June 13. Latin Saints of the Orthodox Patriarchate of Rome.
 The Roman Martyrology. Transl. by the Archbishop of Baltimore. Last Edition, According to the Copy Printed at Rome in 1914. Revised Edition, with the Imprimatur of His Eminence Cardinal Gibbons. Baltimore: John Murphy Company, 1916. p. 172.
 Rev. Richard Stanton. A Menology of England and Wales, or, Brief Memorials of the Ancient British and English Saints Arranged According to the Calendar, Together with the Martyrs of the 16th and 17th Centuries. London: Burns & Oates, 1892. pp. 267–268.
Greek Sources
 Great Synaxaristes:  13 ΙΟΥΝΙΟΥ. ΜΕΓΑΣ ΣΥΝΑΞΑΡΙΣΤΗΣ.
  Συναξαριστής. 13 Ιουνίου. ECCLESIA.GR. (H ΕΚΚΛΗΣΙΑ ΤΗΣ ΕΛΛΑΔΟΣ). 
  13 Ιουνίου. Αποστολική Διακονία της Εκκλησίας της Ελλάδος (Apostoliki Diakonia of the Church of Greece).
  13/06/2017. Ορθόδοξος Συναξαριστής. 
Russian Sources
  26 июня (13 июня). Православная Энциклопедия под редакцией Патриарха Московского и всея Руси Кирилла (электронная версия). (Orthodox Encyclopedia - Pravenc.ru).
  13 июня по старому стилю / 26 июня по новому стилю. Русская Православная Церковь - Православный церковный календарь на 2017 год.
  13 июня (ст.ст.) 26 июня 2014 (нов. ст.). Русская Православная Церковь Отдел внешних церковных связей. (DECR).

June in the Eastern Orthodox calendar